Agonum scitulum is a species of ground beetle in the Platyninae subfamily. It is found in European countries like Belarus, Belgium, Estonia, France, Germany, Great Britain, Hungary, Ireland, Italy, Latvia, Netherlands, Romania, Russia, and Switzerland.

References

Beetles described in 1828
scitulum
Beetles of Europe
Taxa named by Pierre François Marie Auguste Dejean